The 28 cm SK L/40 "Bruno" (SK — Schnelladekanone (quick-loading cannon) L — Länge (with a 40 caliber barrel) was a German railroad gun. Originally a naval gun, it was adapted for land service after its ships were disarmed beginning in 1916. It served on the Western Front and on coast defense duties in Occupied Flanders during World War I. Belgium received four guns as reparations after the war. The Germans used two of those guns in World War II after Belgium's surrender during the Battle of France and on coast-defense duties on the Gironde Estuary for the rest of the war.

Design and history 
One change made for land service was the fitting of a large counterweight just forward of the trunnions to counteract the preponderance of weight towards the breech. This, although heavy, was simpler than adding equilibrators to perform the same function.

The firing platform was a semi-portable mount that could be emplaced anywhere after several weeks of labor to prepare the position. It rotated on a pivot at the front of the mount. The rear was supported by rollers resting on a semicircular rail and was generally equipped with a gun shield.

B.) mounts successfully used by other German railroad guns.

The E. u. B. could fire from any suitable section of track after curved wedges were bolted to the track behind each wheel to absorb any residual recoil after the gun cradle recoiled backwards. It also had a pintle built into the underside of the front of the mount. Two large rollers were fitted to the underside of the mount at the rear. Seven cars could carry a portable metal firing platform (Bettungslafette) that had a central pivot mount and an outer rail. It was assembled with the aid of a derrick or crane, which took between three and five days, and railroad tracks were laid slightly past the firing platform to accommodate the front bogies of the gun. The gun was moved over the firing platform and then lowered into position after the central section of rail was removed. After the gun's pintle was bolted to the firing platform's pivot mount, the entire carriage was jacked up so that the trucks and their sections of rail could be removed. The carriage was then lowered so that the rear rollers rested on the outer track. Concrete versions were also used. It could have up to 360° of traverse.

Ammunition 
Ammunition was moved by means of an overhead rail from which a shell trolley carried individual shells to be placed in the loading tray fixed to the breech. An extensible rail could be raised and braced in place to allow the shell trolley to reach shells placed on the ground or in an ammunition car behind the mount. This ammunition car sometimes had its own overhead rail to move the shells forward to where the trolley in the mount could reach it through a hatch in the roof. The shell and powder were manually rammed into the gun. The gun had to be loaded at zero elevation and thus needed to be re-aimed between each shot. It used the German naval system of ammunition where the base charge was held in a metallic cartridge case and supplemented by another charge in a silk bag which was rammed first.

Combat history 

The Navy kept most of the "Brunos" and used them on coast-defense duties, mainly in Occupied Flanders to protect the ports of Ostend and Zeebrugge. Sailor Artillery Regiment 1 defended the latter with Batteries Hessen (3 or 4 guns) and Braunschweig (4 x "Brunos"). Those same sources disagree about the number of guns assigned to Batteries Hannover (3 or 4 "Brunos") and Preussen (4 guns) defending Ostende under the command of Sailor Artillery Regiment 2. Battery Rossbach, with 2 guns, saw service against the British during the German spring offensive in March–April 1918. Only two "Brunos" were given to the Army - they served in Battery 746 and Bavarian Battery 1005. The latter gun, on E. u. B. mount No. 7, formerly carried by Hessen, was captured by the Australian Army on 8 August 1918. Its barrel is preserved today in Canberra, Australia, as the Amiens Gun.

After the Armistice was signed on 11 November 1918, a battery of four "Brunos" stationed in Belgium sought asylum in the Netherlands. They were given to Belgium as reparations. Six were destroyed in 1921–22 by the Military Inter-Allied Commission of Control.

After the surrender of Belgium on 28 May 1940, two "Brunos" were used by Battery 655 between 8 and 10 June to fire on Brimont and Reims from Amifontaine. One gun was destroyed when a shell detonated prematurely in the barrel while firing on those targets. By the end of 1941, two "Brunos" were assigned to Battery 721 and stationed at Le Verdon-sur-Mer defending the mouth of the Gironde Estuary under the command of Artillery Group Gironde-South. The battery was able to retreat to Germany by 1 September 1944 after the invasion of Normandy began in June 1944, but nothing is known of its activities afterwards.

Notes

References

Sources 
 
 François, Guy. Eisenbahnartillerie: Histoire de l'artillerie lourd sur voie ferrée allemande des origines à 1945. Paris: Editions Histoire et Fortifications, 2006
 Jäger, Herbert. German Artillery of World War One. Ramsbury, Marlborough, Wiltshire: Crowood Press, 2001 
 Kosar, Franz. Eisenbahngeschütz der Welt. Stuttgart: Motorbook, 1999 
 Miller, H. W., Lt. Col. Railway Artillery: A Report on the Characteristics, Scope of Utility, Etc., of Railway Artillery, Volume I Washington: Government Print Office, 1921

External links 

 SK L/40 at Navweaps.com
 "Bruno" at Landships

World War I railway artillery of Germany
280 mm artillery